The 2020 MAC women's basketball tournament was the postseason women's basketball tournament for the Mid-American Conference (MAC). The tournament's first-round games were held on campus sites at the higher seed on March 9, followed by the quarterfinals at Rocket Mortgage FieldHouse in Cleveland on March 11. The remaining rounds were to be held at Rocket Mortgage FieldHouse on March 13 and 14, and the champion was to receive the MAC's automatic bid to the NCAA tournament. Just prior to the first scheduled men's quarterfinal game on March 12, the conference announced that the remainder of both the men's and women's tournaments were canceled in response to concerns over the coronavirus pandemic. Later that day, the National Collegiate Athletic Association (NCAA) announced that all winter and spring sports championships were canceled.

Schedule

Source

Bracket

See also
 2020 MAC men's basketball tournament

References 

Mid-American Conference women's basketball tournament
2019–20 Mid-American Conference women's basketball season
MAC women's basketball tournament
Basketball competitions in Cleveland
College basketball tournaments in Ohio
Women's sports in Ohio
MAC women's basketball tournament